Mary Hatcher (June 6, 1929 – April 3, 2018) was an American coloratura soprano and actress whose screen career spanned the years from 1946-51. During that time she appeared in eight films, mostly in credited roles and several times as leading lady.

Early life and career

At the time of Mary's birth, her father, William Frank Hatcher, was employed by the Polk Company, a large citrus canning firm owned by Ralph Polk Sr. When the company relocated to Tampa, Florida, the Hatcher family followed. Hatcher grew up in Tampa, attending Gorrie Elementary and Woodrow Wilson Junior High, where she often sang at student assemblies, her favorite song being "Alice Blue Gown". 

Her father's employer, Ralph Polk, heard one of her weekly broadcasts that featured operatic and classical songs, and he provided funds so that she could obtain professional voice training, including attending the Gardner School for Girls and the school of Queens Mario of the Metropolitan Opera.

During the early months of World War II, Hatcher sang at a number of events in Tampa to raise money for British War Relief. In 1941, her mother took her to New York City, where she performed at Carnegie Hall. While in New York, continued financial aid from Polk enabled Hatcher to obtain vocal instruction from the Juilliard School of Music.

Film career

By 1944, the Hatcher family had moved to California, and in August that year Paramount Pictures signed Mary to a seven-year contract. When she was 15, Hatcher was selected to play Laurey in a road production of Oklahoma!  At the same time, she was already signed to the movie contract, but her film debut was delayed for a year while she toured with the play.

In 1946, she made her first film appearance, an uncredited role as a chorus girl in M-G-M's Till the Clouds Roll By. Her first credited screen role came later that year when she played Dibs Downing in Our Hearts Were Growing Up. She had another uncredited role in the 1947 film, The Trouble with Women. Later in 1947, Hatcher's career received a major boost when Paramount gave her the title role in the all-star revue Variety Girl. The film's sketchy plot followed the exploits of two young women trying to break into the movies. Their adventures on the Paramount lot provided a frame for short cameo performances by practically every player the studio had under contract, including stars like Bing Crosby, Bob Hope, Gary Cooper, Paulette Goddard and Burt Lancaster. In September, Hatcher returned to Tampa for a gala opening of the film at the Tampa Theatre. Crowds turned out to honor their home-town movie star, and Tampa mayor Curtis Hixon presented Hatcher with a golden key to the city.

In 1948, Hatcher was featured as Veronica Lake's sister in the musical Isn't It Romantic?. Her show business career reached its high point in 1949 when she starred in two pictures, first in The Big Wheel, an auto racing action film with Mickey Rooney and Thomas Mitchell, then opposite Desi Arnaz in the Latin musical frolic Holiday in Havana. Also in 1949, she appeared on Broadway as Dallas Smith, the female lead in Johnny Mercer's musical Texas, L'il Darlin, which opened to a mixed reception and closed after a medium-length run of 293 performances. Her Broadway credits also include Oklahoma!.

Personal appearances
Hatcher visited Tampa in 1951 to perform with her husband, Herkie Styles, at the Skyline Room of the Bayshore Royal Hotel. The local press described the formerly brunette Hatcher as "very blond", noting  she had recently been singing with Howard Keel in the extended Broadway run of Oklahoma!. In February 1951, Hatcher was a headliner at the El Rancho Vegas Hotel in Las Vegas on a bill including Herkie Styles and Benny Goodman. In 1951-52, she starred as Maid Marion in Tales of Robin Hood.

Later life
Hatcher left show business in 1952, partially due to the fact that her marriage to Styles had ended. She declined the offer to play Alice Kramden in The Honeymooners. On September 23, 1951, she married drummer Alvin Stoller in Westwood, California, and became a housewife. She remained married to Stoller until his death in 1992. Despite retiring from show business, she occasionally appeared on television and composed songs.

Personal life 
Hatcher married James Alexander on August 12, 1946, in Seattle. At the time, the two were touring in a production of Oklahoma!, with Alexander playing Curley and Hatcher playing Laurey. A problem, arose, however, because Hatcher, at 17, needed her parents' consent to marry, and they did not consent. Her father had the marriage annulled. On May 9, 1949, Hatcher married Herkie Styles in St. Louis. At the time, Styles was a comedian with Benny Goodman's orchestra.

Death
Hatcher died at the age of 88 from bile duct cancer at a hospital in Riverside, California. Her death was announced by her grandson, John Stoller. She was also survived by her brother, two children, six other grandchildren and two great-grandchildren.

Filmography
Our Hearts Were Growing Up (1946)
Till the Clouds Roll By (1946) (uncredited)
The Trouble with Women (1947) (uncredited)
Variety Girl (1947)
Isn't It Romantic? (1948)
Holiday in Havana (1949)
The Big Wheel (1949)
Tales of Robin Hood (1951)

References

External links

 
 
 

1929 births
2018 deaths
Paramount Pictures contract players
Actresses from Tampa, Florida
American film actresses
American television actresses
American musical theatre actresses
People from Haines City, Florida
Deaths from cholangiocarcinoma
Deaths from cancer in California
21st-century American women